This article lists political parties in Cyprus. 
Cyprus has a multi-party system, with three or four strong parties who generally dominate the political landscape.

List of political parties

Parliamentary parties
As per the parliamentary elections of 2021

Non-parliamentary parties and political organisations
 Solidarity Movement (Κίνημα Αλληλεγγύη)
 Cyprus Social Ecology Movement (Κίνημα Κοινωνικής Οικολογίας Κύπρου) 
 New Internationalist Left (Νέα Διεθνιστική Αριστερά)
 New Wave – The Other Cyprus (Νέο Κύμα - Η Άλλη Κύπρος)
 United Democrats (Ενωμένοι Δημοκράτες)
 Popular Socialist Movement (Λαϊκό Σοσιαλιστικό Κίνημα)
 Jasmine Movement (Κίνημα Γιασεμί)
 Workers' Democracy (Εργατική Δημοκρατία)
 Liberal Democrats (Φιλελεύθεροι Δημοκράτες)
 Famagusta for Cyprus (Αμμόχωστος για την Κύπρο)

Non-parliamentary parties that no longer exist
 Democratic Front (DIPA) led by Spyros Kyprianou in 1976. 
 Democratic National Party (DEK).
 New Democratic Front (NEDIPA) founded by Alecos Michaelides in 1980.
 Pancyprian Renewal Front (PAME) founded by Chrysostomos A. Sofianos in 1980.
 Union of the Center founded by Tassos Papadopoulos in 1980.
 The Liberal Party, founded by former Foreign Minister Nicos Rolandis in 1986 and merged with Democratic Rally in 1998.
 Fighting Democratic Movement, merged with DIKO in 2011.
 New Horizons, merged with European Democracy in 2005 and formed the European Party.
 European Democracy, merged with New Horizons in 2005 and formed the European Party.
 Committee for a Radical Left Rally (Επιτροπή για μια Ριζοσπαστική Αριστερή Συσπείρωση).
 European Party, merged with Solidarity Movement in 2016.
 Citizen's Alliance (Συμμαχία Πολιτών) founded by Giorgos Lilikas.

See also
 List of political parties in Northern Cyprus
 Lists of political parties

References 

Political parties in Cyprus
Cyprus
Politics of Northern Cyprus
 
Political parties
Cyprus
Cyprus